Susan Dentzer an American health care and health policy analyst, commentator, and journalist. She is the President and Chief Executive Officer of America’s Physician Groups, the organization of more than 335 physician practices that provide patient-centered, coordinated, and integrated care for patients while being accountable for cost and quality. Until April 2022, she was a Senior Policy Fellow at the Robert J. Margolis Center for Health Policy at Duke University, located in Washington, DC. She was formerly president and chief executive officer of the Network for Excellence in Health Innovation (NEHI). Prior to NEHI she served as the senior policy adviser for the Robert Wood Johnson Foundation. She was the editor-in-chief of the journal Health Affairs.

Background
She is an elected member of the National Academy of Medicine (formerly the Institute of Medicine) and the Council on Foreign Relations. She is a former health correspondent for the News Hour with Jim Lehrer and correspondent and columnist for U.S. News & World Report and Newsweek. She is a graduate of Dartmouth College, class of 1977, and a member of the Nieman Fellowship class of 1987. She served on the Board of Trustees of Dartmouth College from 1993 to 2004.

Early life
In 1973, she became one of the first women to attend Dartmouth. In 1993 she was the first alumna to be nominated to the board of trustees in an alumni election, and in 2001 she became the first alumna to chair the board of trustees. She is now a trustee emerita at Dartmouth.

Career
In May 2008 Dentzer joined Health Affairs, a journal on health policy in the US and internationally, until 2013. In 1998 Dentzer joined "The NewsHour" serving as its on-air health correspondent for ten years and leading the show's award-winning unit covering health care and health policy. Before joining "The NewsHour", Dentzer served from 1987 to 1997 as chief economics correspondent and economics columnist for U.S. News & World Report. Prior to her role at U.S. News, Dentzer was at Newsweek reporting on business news as a senior writer.
Dentzer's 2015 PBS documentary Reinventing American Healthcare covered the Geisinger Health System.

Memberships
 Member of the National Academy of Medicine (formerly the Institute of Medicine) and member of its Board on Population Health and Public Health Practice
 Member of the Council on Foreign Relations
 Fellow of the National Academy of Social Insurance
 Fellow of the Hastings Center
 Member of the board of directors of the International Rescue Committee
 Member of the board of directors of the American Board of Medical Specialties
 Member of the board of directors of the Public Health Institute
 Member of the RAND Health Board of Advisors
 Member of the March of Dimes national advisory board

References

External links

Duke University School of Medicine faculty
Dartmouth College alumni
Living people
Members of the National Academy of Medicine
Year of birth missing (living people)
Academic journal editors